Scarodytes is a genus of beetles in the family Dytiscidae, containing the following species:

 Scarodytes halensis (Fabricius, 1787)
 Scarodytes malickyi Wewalka, 1977
 Scarodytes margaliti Wewalka, 1977
 Scarodytes nigriventris (Zimmermann, 1919)
 Scarodytes pederzanii Angelini, 1973
 Scarodytes ruffoi Franciscolo, 1961
 Scarodytes savinensis (Zimmermann, 1933)

References

Dytiscidae